Oberdan is both a masculine given name and a surname. Notable people with the name include:

Given name
Oberdan Cattani (1919–2014), Brazilian football player 
Oberdan Sallustro (1915–1972), Italian-Paraguayan businessman

Surname
Guglielmo Oberdan, (1858–1882), Italian irredentist

Pen name
Oberdán Rocamora, pen name of Jorge Asís (born 1946), Argentine journalist and politician

Surnames of Italian origin
Italian masculine given names